Hammond Island is a small island in Suisun Bay, California. It is part of Solano County. An 1850 survey map of the San Francisco Bay area made by Cadwalader Ringgold shows islands partially covering some of the current area of Hammond Island, labeled "Davis Island" and "Warrington Island".

References

Islands of the San Francisco Bay Area
Islands of Northern California
Islands of Solano County, California
Islands of Suisun Bay
Islands of the Sacramento–San Joaquin River Delta